Somebody Loves You may refer to:
 Somebody Loves You (album), a 1975 album by Crystal Gayle
 "Somebody Loves You" (Crystal Gayle song), the album's title track
 "Somebody Loves You" (1932 song), by Peter deRose and Charles Tobias
 "Somebody Loves You" (Nik Kershaw song), 1999
 "Somebody Loves You" (Betty Who song), 2012 
 "Somebody Loves You Baby (You Know Who It Is)", a 1991 song by Patti LaBelle
 Somebody Loves You, a 2009 album by Austin Lucas
 "Somebody Loves You", a song by The Delfonics from Sound of Sexy Soul
 "Somebody Loves You", a song by Eels from Shootenanny!
 "Somebody (Loves You)", a song by Plies from Definition of Real